Lalanam is a 1996 Indian Malayalam film, directed by Chandrasekharan. The film stars Siddique, Jagathy Sreekumar, Innocent and Vinaya Prasad in the lead roles. The film has musical score by S. P. Venkatesh.

Cast
Siddique as Vijayakumar
Jagathy Sreekumar as Karuparambil Sunny
Innocent as Dr. Sreekumaran Unnithan
Vinaya Prasad as Sasikala Vijayakumar
Baby Shamili as Ammu
 Ragini as Priya Unnithan
 Shine Mohan
Shanthi Krishna as Selina Sunny
M. S. Thripunithura as Swamy
Jose Pellissery as Adv. Sathyanathan
N. F. Varghese as Adv. Rajedran
M. G. Soman as Shekhara Menon
Shankaradi as Madhavan Pilla
Sukumari as Rugmini

Soundtrack
The music was composed by S. P. Venkatesh and the lyrics were written by Gireesh Puthenchery.

References

External links
 

1996 films
1990s Malayalam-language films